Troiani is a surname. Notable people with the surname include:

Don Troiani (born 1949), American historical painter
Giovanni Battista Troiani (1844–1927), Italian sculptor
Luigi Troiani (born 1964), Italian rugby player
Maria Caterina Troiani (1813–1887), Italian charitable worker